David C. Larbalestier is an American scientist who has contributed to research in superconducting materials for magnets and power applications. He is currently a Professor of Mechanical Engineering and a member of the Applied Superconductivity Center at the National High Magnetic Field Laboratory at Florida State University. He also holds emeritus status in the Materials Science and Engineering department at the University of Wisconsin–Madison, which was his academic home until 2006.

He was elected a member of the National Academy of Engineering in 2003 for advancing our understanding of the materials science of high-field superconductors and for developing processing techniques that incorporate this knowledge. He is a fellow of the Royal Academy of Engineering.

His materials research interests include improving superconducting properties of many materials, including NbTi, Nb3Sn, MgB2, YBCO, and BSCCO.

Awards and honors
Fellow of the American Physical Society (1990) 
Member, National Academy of Engineering (2003)
The International Cryogenics Materials Conference Lifetime Achievement Award (2007)

References

External links
 National High Magnetic Field Laboratory Profile
 Applied Superconductivity Center
 Florida State University
 University of Wisconsin–Madison

Living people
Year of birth missing (living people)
Alumni of Imperial College London
Fellows of the Institute of Physics
Florida State University faculty
University of Wisconsin–Madison faculty
American materials scientists
Members of the United States National Academy of Engineering
Fellows of the American Physical Society